The 2023 season is Albirex Niigata (S) Women's 2nd consecutive season in the top flight of Singapore football 

The female team will be playing in the Women's Premier League (Singapore).

Their marquee player is former Japan international Kana Kitahara.

Squad

Women Squad

Coaching staff

Transfer

In

Pre-season

Note 1: .

Loan In 
Pre-season

Loan Return 
Pre-season

Out
Pre-season

Loan Out

Friendly

Pre-season

Team statistics

Appearances and goals (Women) 

|}

Competitions

Women's Premier League

League table

References

Albirex Niigata Singapore FC
Albirex Niigata Singapore FC seasons
2023
1